

Events
A gang war breaks out between the Hip Sing and On Leong Tongs over illegal gambling in New York's Chinatown. 
New York Black Hand leader Giuseppe Morello is arrested for counterfeiting and sentenced to three years. Released in 1902, Morello establishes a system where counterfeit $5 US dollar bills would be printed in Sicily and smuggled into the United States. 
Ignazio Lupo, known as "Lupo the Wolf", arrives in New York.
Charles Umbriaco arrives in New York later joining the Black Hand under Giuseppe Morello and Ignazio Lupo.

Births
Samson Melvin "Samoots", Chicago leader of Unione Siciliana
Louis Amberg, New York (Brooklyn) gangster 
Anthony Carfano "Little Augie Pisano", Florida gambling racketeer 
Joseph J. DiCarlo "Jerry the Wolf"; "Joe the Gyp", Stefano Magaddino gunman and Miami gambling racketeer 
Murray Humphreys, Chicago Outfit member 
Vincent John Rao (Frank Arra; Nunzio), Lucchese crime family consiglieri and associate of Willie Moretti 
Jacob Shapiro, "Gurrah" Labor union racketeer 
Abner Zwillman, "Longie" New Jersey Prohibition gangster 
January 17 – Al Capone "Scarface", Chicago Mafia leader 
December 1 – Gaetano Lucchese, Lucchese crime family founder
December 24 – Moe Dalitz [Morris Barney Dalitz], Cleveland mobster and Las Vegas casino owner

References

Years in organized crime
Organized crime